Sean Baker may refer to:

 Sean Baker (soldier), American soldier injured at Guantanamo Bay
 Sean Baker (American football) (born 1988), American football player
 Sean Baker (filmmaker) (born 1971), American film director, cinematographer, producer, screenwriter and editor